Red Bud MX is a US motocross race track located in Buchanan, Michigan, USA. The track is located just north of town, surrounded the agricultural farming fields. It is home to one of the largest motocross tracks in the Midwest, is favorite to many pro riders, and is also known to have "The best dirt on earth." The track attracts 30,000+ attendees every Fourth of July weekend for the AMA Motocross Championship.

History 
The property Red Bud MX sits on was purchased in 1972 by Gene Ritchie and his wife Nancy with the Patterson and Miller families as partners. Gene, originally from Pennsylvania, had visited Buchanan on a snowmobiling trip.  He saw the potential for a great motocross track in Buchanan, and within a few years he and his partners bought land on the west side of North Red Bud Trail, and began to build his track. They named the track Red Bud TNT (Track n Trail) after the name of the road the track sits on, the numerous Red Bud trees in the region, and because of Buchanan's city nickname, Red Bud City.

Red Bud first began holding races in 1973 and held its first AMA National race in 1974 which was won by Mike Hartwig.

The Red Bud track itself has been renovated and remodeled over the years but the infamous jump called LaRocco's Leap still remains. LaRocco's leap, constructed in 1991, is the longest jump in the MX circuit stretching . Named after Laporte, Indiana, native Mike LaRocco who was the inspiration for the jump which was based on a jump at Larocco' personal track called "Kong."  Larocco was the first man to clear it and did so on a 125cc bike.

The Traxxas TORC Series held off-road truck and buggy races at the track from 2011 to 2013. The 2012 two-day weekend was the second event of the season and it was televised on Discovery Network's Velocity channel.

There is an unofficial call and answer that has been adopted by Redbud fans and residents of southwestern Michigan. An individual will call, "ReeeedBuuuud!" and all the fans who hear will shout, "ReeeedBuuuud!" in return.  The call has become a chorus that can be heard throughout the summer in the RedBud community.

The venue hosted the 72nd running of the Motocross of Nations on October 6–7, 2018. This was one of the biggest races the track hosted.

RedBud is currently run by two of Gene and Nancy's children, Amy Ritchie and Tim Ritchie. Gene Ritchie died on February 20, 2016, age 79.

Amenities 
Red Bud MX has three tracks: the professional motocross track and a KTM Kids track for younger riders. Along with a "Night track" used only on the Fourth of July national. 
The big weekend of the year is Nationals weekend, visitors are allowed to camp out on the property every 4 July weekend. There are spaces throughout the grounds for tents, campers, and RVs.
During AMA Pro Motocross Nationals weekend, there are concession stands and food vendors from the local community selling food, water, and spirits.  During regular race weekends there are also concessions and a few vendors as well.

Champions 
Red Bud AMA Motocross Results:

References

Bradford, Mark. “Racers Ready for Red Bud Motocross.” South Bend Tribune 2 July 2004: B1. Print.
“10 Things To Watch For At Red Bud.” Allisports. n.d. Web. 26 March 2013.
"RedBud Motocross Notes 2012." Motorcycle-USA. 6 July 2012. Web. 24 March 2013.

External links
Official website
Lucas Oil Pro Motocross Championships
Mike Hartwig Motoscribble

Buildings and structures in Berrien County, Michigan
Motorsport venues in Michigan
Off-road racing venues in the United States
Tourist attractions in Berrien County, Michigan
1973 establishments in Michigan
Sports venues completed in 1973